Karin Korb (born 1967) is a retired American wheelchair tennis player of German parentage who competed in international level events. She has participated at the Summer Paralympics twice. She was the first disabled person to receive a Division I athletic scholarship to Georgia State University to play intercollegiate wheelchair tennis. Prior to entering Georgia State and earning her master's degree there, Korb graduated with a bachelor's counterpart from Division III and thus non-scholarship Kean University in her birth state, New Jersey.

When she was 17, Korb broke her back after falling badly from a gymnastics vault which left her paralyzed from the waist down and has used a wheelchair since the accident. Raised in Clifton, New Jersey, she graduated from Clifton High School, where she was chosen as homecoming queen in her senior year.

Korb played tennis at the age of 27. She is a feminist since she was 10.

References

1967 births
Living people
Sportspeople from Birmingham, Alabama
Georgia State Panthers women's tennis players
American feminists
American gymnasts
American people of German descent
Clifton High School (New Jersey) alumni
Kean University alumni
Paralympic wheelchair tennis players of the United States
People with paraplegia
Wheelchair tennis players at the 2000 Summer Paralympics
Wheelchair tennis players at the 2004 Summer Paralympics
Sportspeople from Clifton, New Jersey
Sportspeople from Passaic, New Jersey